Selvena is a small hill-town, population 578, in southern Tuscany, Italy.

History 
The village dates back to the times of Etruscans and Romans, who exploited its important cinnabar mines. In the Middle Ages, the powerful Aldobrandeschi family (rulers of much of southern Tuscany) built here the massive Rocca Silvana (9th  century), which saw an intense history of battles and sieges between the Aldobrandeschi, the Orsini and the Republic of Siena.

Notes 

Frazioni of the Province of Grosseto
Cities and towns in Tuscany